Maksim Vladimirovich Demenko (born 21 March 1976) is a Russian football manager and a former player who played as a central midfielder.

He is one of six players who scored for six different teams in the Russian Premier League and the only player who had to take-over in goal when the goalkeeper was sent-off after all the substitutions have been made on two separate occasions (he allowed goals in both games, including a decisive goal for FC Anzhi Makhachkala against FC Zenit in 2000).

Honours
 Ukrainian Premier League winner: 1994
 Russian Cup winner: 2003

International career
Demenko has made his debut for Russia on 26 April 2000 in a friendly against the United States.

External links
 Profile 

1976 births
Living people
Sportspeople from Krasnodar
Russian people of Ukrainian descent
Russian footballers
Russia under-21 international footballers
Russia international footballers
Russian expatriate footballers
Expatriate footballers in Ukraine
FC Kuban Krasnodar players
FC Dynamo Kyiv players
FC Lada-Tolyatti players
PFC Krylia Sovetov Samara players
FC Zhemchuzhina Sochi players
FC Zenit Saint Petersburg players
FC Rostov players
FC Spartak Moscow players
FC Krasnodar players
Russian Premier League players
Ukrainian Premier League players
FC Chernomorets Novorossiysk players
Association football midfielders